Arthur Sewell is the name of:

Arthur Sewell (athlete) (1903–1984), British athlete
Arthur Sewell (footballer) (born 1934), English footballer

See also
Arthur Sewall (1835–1900), American shipbuilder